Mathias Wolf Farm is a historic home and farm located in Madison Township, Jefferson County, Indiana.  The farmhouse was built about 1854, and is a -story, central passage plan, vernacular Gothic Revival style limestone dwelling. Also on the property are the contributing smokehouse, outhouse, transverse-frame barn, and shed.

It was listed on the National Register of Historic Places in 2016.

References

Farms on the National Register of Historic Places in Indiana
Gothic Revival architecture in Indiana
Houses completed in 1854
Buildings and structures in Jefferson County, Indiana
National Register of Historic Places in Jefferson County, Indiana
1854 establishments in Indiana